Pimeä saartaa meitä is the second album released by the Finnish progressive rock band Tuvalu.

Track listing
"Irma Vep" - 4:14
"Maanjäristys" - 4:42
"Kadotettu" - 4:17
"Järjestys ja kuri" - 4:16
"Kiitospäivän ilta" - 6:16
"Jaettu modernin unelma" - 3:38
"Kiireetön tila" - 6:32
"Neuroromantiikkaa" - 3:09
"Meditaatio" - 8:05

External links
Pimeä saartaa meitä at BSA-store.com

References 

2006 albums
Tuvalu (band) albums